The first deputy prime minister of Spain, officially First Vice President of the Government of Spain, is the second in command to the prime minister of Spain, assuming its duties when the prime minister is absent or incapable of exercising power. When there is only one deputy prime minister in the government, the office is referred to without the cardinal number: deputy prime minister of Spain, officially Vice President of the Government of Spain.

The person for the post is usually handpicked by the Prime Minister from the members of the Cabinet and appointed by the monarch before whom it takes oath. The headquarters of the Deputy Prime Minister's Office is the Semillas Building, in La Moncloa Complex.

History
The office of Deputy Prime Minister, like the premiership, dates back to the 19th century. A part of the doctrine considers that the creation of the office was in 1925, after the dictator Miguel Primo de Rivera ended with the military government and establish a civil government. However, the historical evidences prove that between 1840 and 1841 the office already existed under the name of Vice President of the Council of Ministers, holding this position the future prime minister Joaquín María Ferrer. After Deputy Prime Minister Ferrer, the office was not used again or was collected by any Constitution or subsequent law until the 20th century.

Assuming the objectives for which the Military Directorate was created were completed, Primo de Rivera transformed the Government of Spain into a civil government in 1925, reestablishing the Council of Ministers, the Presidency of the Council of Ministers and re-creating the Vice Presidency, whose objective was to replace to the president in cases of absence or illness. This vice-president, said article 3 of the Royal Decree, was appointed by the president from among the members of the Council of Ministers. The Vice Presidency was vested in the Under Secretary of the Interior, Severiano Martínez Anido, who combined the position with that of Interior Minister.

With the resignation of Primo de Rivera and the fall of the monarchy, the Second Republic was established in Spain, which did not foresee at any time the existence of this position, however, in December 1933, Prime Minister Lerroux appointed Diego Martínez Barrio Vice President of the Council of Ministers, a position to which he resigned only three months later.

At the same time as the Presidency, the Vice Presidency changed its name with the Law of January 30, 1938, to Vice Presidency of the Government and, with the formation of the first Franco government, this position was granted to general Francisco Gómez-Jordana Sousa. From 1938 to 1981 the position was occupied by military officials, with the exception of the vice presidents Torcuato Fernández Miranda (1973-1973) and José García Hernández (1974-1975). Since 1981, with a democracy markedly established in society, Prime Minister Calvo-Sotelo appointed a civilian as Deputy, definitively separating the military power from the executive power, a situation that remains today.

Responsibilities 
The Deputy Prime Minister of Spain is responsible for:
 Advising the Prime Minister.
 Supporting the Cabinet, the Government Delegated Committees and the General Commission of Secretaries of State and Undersecretaries.
 Supporting the Prime Minister, specially exercising the responsibilities in relation to preparing and tracking the Government Programme.
 Interministerial coordination given by current laws, the Government or the Prime Minister.
 Supporting the Government with its relationships with the Cortes Generales.
 Preparing, carrying out and tracking the legislative programme of the Government and specially its parliamentary processing.
 Material supporting, economic, financial, personal and budgetary management and in general whatever responsibilities needed by the Prime Minister and the Office of the Prime Minister bodies.
 Being the Secretary at the Council of Ministers.

List of officeholders

See also 
Second Deputy Prime Minister of Spain
Third Deputy Prime Minister of Spain
Fourth Deputy Prime Minister of Spain

References

External links
 Official website

Government of Spain